Budak is a village in the Gospić municipality in the Lika region in central Croatia. It is located near Gospić, connected by the D25 highway.

The 1712–14 census of Lika and Krbava registered 237 inhabitants, out of whom 114 were Catholic Carniolans, 45 were Catholic Croats, 45 were Catholic Bunjevci, 15 were unknown and 11 Catholicized "Turks".

References

Populated places in Lika-Senj County